Richard Berko is a Ghanaian professional footballer who plays as a forward for Ghanaian Premier League side Karela United. He previously played for Division One League side Bekwai Youth Academy.

Career

Early career 
Berko started his career with Bekwai Youth Academy and played for them in the Ghana Division One League from 2017 before moving to Karela United in 2020.

Karela United 
In April 2020, Karela United signed him and his fellow BYFA player Thomas Gyewu after the league was suspended and later cancelled due to the COVID-19 pandemic. He made his debut in the 1st match of the 2020–21 Ghana Premier League season. On 20 November 2020, he was named in the starting line up and in the process playing the full 90 minutes to help them to a 2–2 draw against Ashanti Gold with the goals coming in from Diawisie Taylor and Samuel Ofori.

He scored his debut goal in match day 7 of the 2020–21 season on 2 January 2021 against Elmina Sharks. He scored the equalizer in the 24th minute to cancel a goal from James Bissue and inspire the team to a 3–1 win.

References

External links 
 

Living people
Association football forwards
Ghanaian footballers
Ghana Premier League players
Karela United FC players
Year of birth missing (living people)